Nici Cumpston,  (born 1963) is an Australian photographer, painter, curator, writer, and educator.

Early life and education
Cumpston's family background is Barkindji (an Aboriginal people of New South Wales), Afghan, Irish and English. Born in Adelaide, she graduated from the University of South Australia with a Bachelor of Arts in Visual Arts.

Career
Cumpston shoots on black-and-white film, which is then scanned and printed digitally on canvas before being hand-coloured. An exhibition of her work, having-been-there, was held at the University of Virginia's Kluge-Ruhe Aboriginal Art Collection in 2014, during which Cumpston spent two months as resident artist.

Employed by the Art Gallery of South Australia (AGSA) since 2008, Cumpston became artistic director of Tarnanthi, the Aboriginal and Torres Strait Islander arts festival held in Adelaide, in 2015. Tarnanthi exhibitions were held at AGSA, the South Australian Museum, the JamFactory and the South Australian School of Art.

Cumpston became Curator Aboriginal and Torres Strait Islander Art at AGSA in 2016, and  remains artistic director role of Tarnanthi.

Recognition
In the 2020 Queen's Birthday Honours, Cumpston was awarded the Medal of the Order of Australia (OAM) for "service to the museums and galleries sector, and to Indigenous art".

Works
In the National Gallery of Victoria:
Flooded Gum, Katarapko Creek, Murray River National Park, 2007
 Nookamka – Lake Bonney
 Tree stumps, western shoreline – Nookamka

In the National Gallery of Australia:
 Campsite V, Nookamka Lake

References

Further reading
 (Bio accompanying Cumpston's photographs of Lake Bonney, or "Nookamka", exhibited as part of an exhibition at NGV.)

External links
 

1963 births
Living people
Recipients of the Medal of the Order of Australia
Australian photographers
Photographers from Adelaide
Australian art curators
Australian women painters
Australian women curators